Mizukoshi Dam is a gravity barrage type dam located in Yamaguchi prefecture in Japan. The dam is used for power production. The catchment area of the dam is 270 km2. The dam impounds about 14  ha of land when full and can store 796 thousand cubic meters of water.

References

Dams in Yamaguchi Prefecture
1965 establishments in Japan